Sartrouville is a commune in the Yvelines department, Île-de-France, north central France. it is located in the north-western suburbs of Paris,  from the center of Paris.

Name
In the Middle Ages the name Sartrouville was recorded in Medieval Latin as Sartoris Villa. The origin and meaning of Sartoris Villa is still debated. Some think the name comes from the Roman patronym Saturus (probably a Gallo-Roman landowner) and means "estate (villa) of Saturus". Others believe that the word sartoris comes from the Medieval Latin past participle exsartum ("cleared for cultivation"), from Latin sartum ("hoed"), and means "estate of the land-clearers", probably in reference to the deforestation that took place around Sartrouville in Antiquity or in the Early Middle Ages to enable the cultivation of the land.

Demographics

Immigration

Sport
Most popular sports can be practiced in Sartrouville, but it is worldwide famous for its triathlon club called ECS Triathlon totalizing 8 olympics medals.

Transport
Sartrouville is served by Sartrouville station on Paris RER line A and on the Transilien Paris-Saint-Lazare suburban rail line.

Education
The commune has 17 preschools and 13 elementary schools, along with a private school.

Junior high schools:
 Collège Colette
 Collège Darius Milhaud
 Collège Louis Paulhan
 Collège Romain Rolland

Senior high schools:
 Lycée Jules-Verne
 Lycée Évariste Galois

Private schools:
 Institut Notre-Dame Lycée Jean-Paul II

Notable people
Frédéric Machado, footballer

See also
Communes of the Yvelines department

References

External links
 
 

Communes of Yvelines